Lusoblothrus is a genus of pseudoscorpions in the family Syarinidae. The genus was created to accommodate its sole species, Lusoblothrus aenigmaticus. The species was recently discovered in Portugal, its description published in 2012.

References

Further reading

External links

 

Neobisioidea
Endemic arthropods of Portugal